"You're the Best Break This Old Heart Ever Had" is a song written by Wayland Holyfield and Randy Hatch, and recorded by American country music artist Ed Bruce.  It was released in November 1981 as the third single from the album One to One.  The song was Bruce's twenty-second country hit and his only number one.  The single went to number one for one week in March 1982, and spent twenty-one weeks on the charts.

Charts

Weekly charts

Year-end charts

References

Ed Bruce songs
1981 singles
Songs written by Wayland Holyfield
Song recordings produced by Tommy West (producer)
MCA Records singles
1981 songs